Cindy Helen Rose  (born 18 August 1965) is an American-British businesswoman, and the President of Microsoft Western Europe (previously Chief Executive of Microsoft UK).

Early life
Rose graduated from Barnard College, where she also studied Political Science at Columbia University, and received a Juris Doctor from New York Law School in June 1990.

Career
Rose has worked for legal companies in both the USA and UK.

Disney
Rose joined Disney in 1995. From 2001 she was Managing Director of Walt Disney International, UK and Ireland, later becoming the Europe head of Disney Interactive (WDIG EMEA) from February 2007.

Virgin Media
Rose also worked as the head of Digital Entertainment (Television) at Virgin Media from November 2009. At Virgin TV she oversaw Virgin TV Anywhere in September 2012.

Vodafone
She was a Director at Vodafone UK until March 2016. She was employed at Vodafone UK to develop a pay-TV service. She helped launch Vodafone Connect in October 2015, a bundled broadband service. She oversaw expansion of the UK estate of stores from 350 to over 500.

Microsoft
Rose was appointed Chief Executive of Microsoft UK in July 2016, officially taking up the position on 1 November 2016. Microsoft UK is headquartered at the Microsoft Campus on Thames Valley Park. In February 2019, she visited St Teilo’s High School and gave an inspirational speech to Year 8 and Year 9 regarding the technology industry. Rose loved the motto of the school she visited, which is 'I can is more important than IQ.’ 

In October 2020 Rose was appointed President of Microsoft Western Europe.

Personal life

Rose is married, with four children. She holds British and American nationality.

Rose was appointed an Officer of the Order of the British Empire (OBE) in the 2019 New Year Honours in recognition of her services to UK Technology.

See also
 Americans in the United Kingdom
 Jeroen Hoencamp, Chief Executive of Vodafone UK until August 2016
 List of broadband providers in the United Kingdom

References

External links
 Microsoft UK

1965 births
Living people
New York Law School alumni
American expatriates in the United Kingdom
American women chief executives
Disney Interactive
Microsoft people
Virgin Media
Vodafone people
Officers of the Order of the British Empire
Barnard College alumni